Tomáš Obermajer (born 27 December 1969) is a Czech former football goalkeeper. He made his first Czech First League start for FK Chmel Blšany at the age of 30, in a 1–0 loss against Viktoria Žižkov in September 2000. He eventually played 13 matches in the Czech First League, all for Blšany.

Obermajer became the goalkeeping coach of Dukla Prague in 2007, a position he held until the end of the 2021–22 season.

References

External links 
 
 

1969 births
Living people
Czech footballers
Association football goalkeepers
Czech First League players
FK Chmel Blšany players